Soojidara is a 2019 Indian Kannada language drama film written and directed by Mounish Badiger, making his debut into Sandalwood. It is jointly produced by Sachidran Aathnayak and Abijith Kotegar under the banner Cine Sneha Talkies. It features Haripriya and Yashwanth Shetty in the lead roles; Yashwanth is making his debut as a lead actor with the film. The supporting cast includes Achyuth Kumar, Suchendra Prasad, and Chaitra Kootoor. The films background score was composed by S. Pradeep Varman and the soundtrack was composed by Bhinna Shadja and the cinematography was handled by Ashok V. Raman and editing was done by Mohan L. Rangakhale.

Cast 

 Hariprriya as Padmashree
 Yashwanth Shetty
 Achyuth Kumar
 Suchendra Prasad
 Chaitra Kootoor
 Shreya Anchan

Soundtrack 

The film's background score was composed by S. Pradeep Varman and the soundtrack was composed by Bhinna Sadja. The music rights were acquired by Ananda Audio.

Release 
The film is scheduled to be released on 10 May 2019 all over Karnataka in around 180 theatres.

References

External links 

 

2010s Kannada-language films
Indian drama films
2019 drama films
Films shot in Mysore
Films shot in Bangalore
2019 films